Kent Osborne aka Ken Osborne is a film director and occasional actor. The films he has directed have mainly been exploitation types. His films include Wild Wheels in  1969, Cain's Cutthroats in 1971, The Ballad of Billie Blue in 1972, Women Unchained  in 1974  and Hollywood Confidential in 2008.

Career (director)

1960s
His earliest directorial work includes Raw Love which was released in 1965. It featured Suzanne Anderson and Mike Perry. Osborne both directed the 1996 biker exploitation flick Wild Wheels as well as co-writing the story. The film starred Don Epperson, Robert Dix, Casey Kasem, 
Terry Stafford, and Dovie Beams who would later find notoriety for her affair with President Ferdinand Marcos. During the filming of Wild Wheels, Osborne was shooting a segment with a foreground and background scene.  He told the men in the background that he wanted some fighting but he forgot to tell them it was only supposed to be faked. Some of it got carried away and Osborne was yelling at them to stop it and repeatedly to cut.

1970s to 1980s
He found a good degree of success with Cain's Cutthroats aka The Blood Seekers, a sleazy violent vengeance western that was set in the civil war era, which starred John Carradine, Scott Brady, Robert Dix, Darwin Joston, and Adair Jameson. Osborne directed and co-wrote the story for The Ballad of Billie Blue, a Christian-themed film with a warning message which was about a country singer who ends up in jail then finds stardom with gospel music. The film premiered in Grand Rapids, Michigan in February, 1972, also opened Thursday April 20, 1972 at the Holland Theatre and was showing for a week. It  was nominated for two Image Awards. Women Unchained , which he directed was a story about five women who during a riot, try to escape from a maximum security prison and while on the run will do what it takes to get to the Mexican border.

1990s to 2000s
In 2008, Hollywood Confidential was released. It starred Vernon Wells, Joe Estevez, James MacPherson, and Jesse Hlubik.

Career (actor)
His earliest acting roles included Dragnet in 1954, Good Morning, Miss Dove and The View from Pompey's Head.
He played the bartender in the 1969 horror film Nightmare in Wax, a Bud Townsend directed film which starred Cameron Mitchell, Scott Brady and Anne Helm. Osborne played the part of Dave Miller in the Al Adamson directed Five Bloody Graves, which was released around 1969, 1970. He played the part of Sergeant Osborne in the Ewing Miles Brown film The Stoneman'' which was released around 2002. The film starred Christopher Atkins, Pat Morita and Robin Riker.

Filmography list

References

External links
 
 Kent Osborne at AFI

American film directors
American male film actors
Living people
Year of birth missing (living people)